Imran Ali (born 3 January 1994) is a Bangladeshi cricketer. He made his first-class debut for Sylhet Division in the 2013–14 National Cricket League on 13 February 2014. He made his List A debut for Partex Sporting Club in the 2016–17 Dhaka Premier Division Cricket League on 30 April 2017. Six days later in his second List A match, he took a five-wicket haul. He made his Twenty20 debut on 31 May 2021, for Partex Sporting Club in the 2021 Dhaka Premier Division Twenty20 Cricket League.

See also
 List of Prime Bank Cricket Club cricketers

References

External links
 

1994 births
Living people
Bangladeshi cricketers
Partex Sporting Club cricketers
Prime Bank Cricket Club cricketers
Sylhet Division cricketers
People from Sylhet